Stalingrad is a 1993 German anti-war film directed by Joseph Vilsmaier. It follows a platoon of German Army soldiers transferred to the Eastern Front of World War II, where they find themselves fighting in the Battle of Stalingrad.

The film is the second German movie to portray the Battle of Stalingrad. It was predated by the 1959 Hunde, wollt ihr ewig leben (Stalingrad: Dogs, Do You Want to Live Forever?).

Plot
In August 1942, German soldiers enjoy leave in Cervo, Liguria, Italy, after fighting at the First Battle of El Alamein, where Unteroffizier Manfred "Rollo" Rohleder and Obergefreiter Fritz Reiser are introduced to Leutnant Hans von Witzland, their new platoon commander. Their unit is promptly sent to the Eastern Front to fight in the Battle of Stalingrad.

Witzland's platoon joins a company commanded by Hauptmann Hermann Musk. Musk leads an assault on a factory, which results in heavy casualties. Later, Witzland requests a ceasefire with the Soviets so both sides can collect their wounded, which they agree to. Müller (called "HGM" to distinguish him from other Müllers) breaks the ceasefire, much to the anger of Witzland and Reiser; the latter angrily assaults him.

Witzland's platoon is surrounded in a decrepit building. During a Soviet attack, Witzland, Reiser, Rollo, Emigholtz, and "GeGe" Müller go down to secure the sewers. Witzland gets separated from the others and captures a female Soviet soldier named Irina; she offers to lead him to safety, but instead pushes him into the water and escapes. His men rescue him, and Emigholtz is found severely wounded by an explosive trap, his right leg hastily having to be amputated by the men; they take him to a crowded aid station, where they grab a doctor at gunpoint to treat Emigholtz, who nonetheless dies. They are then arrested by  Hauptmann Haller, who has previously clashed with Witzland regarding the treatment of Soviet prisoners. They are assigned to a penal battalion, disarming land mines.

Four weeks later, a brutal winter has set in and the Soviets have surrounded the German Sixth Army. Hauptmann Musk thus reassigns the penal battalion—which includes disgraced fellow officer Otto—to combat duty, after the men threaten to mutiny unless their crimes are pardoned. Witzland's platoon defends a position from a Soviet tank column, and emerge victorious after a bloody battle. Hauptmann Haller later orders von Witzland and his men to execute some unarmed civilians, much to their reluctance.

Witzland, GeGe, and Reiser decide to desert and head towards Pitomnik Airfield in hopes of catching a plane back to Germany, stealing medical tags from some dead bodies along the way to feign being wounded. By the time they arrive, the last transport has left. They rejoin the others in the shelter, where they find Musk suffering from severe trench foot. While the men recover a German supply drop, Haller appears and holds them at gunpoint, but is quickly subdued; he accidentally shoots GeGe as he falls, killing him. Haller then pleads for his life, telling them about the supplies he is hoarding in a nearby house before being executed by Otto.

In the house's cellar they find shelves stocked full of food and liquor, and Irina tied to a bed. Witzland cuts Irina free. As the rest of the men gorge themselves, a deluded and dying Musk tries to rally them to rejoin the fighting. Otto becomes hysterical and commits suicide. Rollo carries Musk outside, only to find the Sixth Army surrendering to the Soviets. Musk succumbs to the elements upon Rollo being instructed to surrender.

Irina offers to help Witzland and Reiser get away, but while trudging through the snow they are shot at by the Soviets; Irina is killed and Witzland wounded. The two Germans get away, but Witzland eventually becomes too weak and dies in Reiser's arms. Reiser cradles his body and freezes to death.

Cast

 Dominique Horwitz as Obergefreiter Fritz Reiser
 Thomas Kretschmann as Leutnant Hans von Witzland
 Jochen Nickel as Unteroffizier Manfred "Rollo" Rohleder
 Sebastian Rudolph as Soldat (rank) "GeGe" Müller (nicknamed GeGe to distinguish him from other Müllers)
 Dana Vávrová as Irina
 Martin Benrath as Generalmajor Hentz (based on Generaloberst Walter Heitz)
 Sylvester Groth as Unteroffizier Otto (formerly a commissioned officer)
 Karel Heřmánek as Hauptmann Hermann Musk
 Heinz Emigholz as Funker (Radioman) Edgar Emigholz
 Ferdinand Schuster as Double Edgar
 Oliver Broumis as Soldat Müller (HGM)
 Dieter Okras as Hauptmann Haller
 Zdeněk Vencl as Gefreiter Wölk
 Mark Kuhn as Feldwebel Pflüger
 Thorsten Bolloff as Soldat Feldmann
 Alexander Wachholz as Pfarrer Renner
 J. Alfred Mehnert as Oberleutnant Lupo
 Ulrike Arnold as Viola
 Christian Knoepfle as Soldat Dieter
 Filip Čáp as Ludwig
 Jaroslav Tomsa as Opa Erwin (Grandpa Erwin)
 Pavel Mang as Kolja
 Otto Ševčík as Major Kock (as Oto Sevcik)
 Jophi Ries as Schröder

Production and release
The film was shot in several locations, including Finland, Italy, and Czechoslovakia, and cost approximately DEM 20 million (around EUR 10 million in modern German currency). Director Joseph Vilsmaier hired a German military consultant to advise him on set. A series entitled The making of Stalingrad was released, featuring a behind-the-scenes look at the film. Stalingrad was released on 4K Blu-ray in 2021.

Reception
In 1993, the film won Bavarian Film Awards for Best Cinematography, Best Editing and Best Production. It was also entered into the 18th Moscow International Film Festival. In Germany, the film earned mixed reviews, allegedly due to the second half of the film containing plot holes, although what these apparent plot holes were is not revealed; this may in fact have been a reference to the film's bleak and nihilistic ending.

The film grossed $10 million in Germany. It grossed $152,972 in the United States and Canada.

See also
 Stalingrad (1990 film)
 Stalingrad (2013 film)

References

External links 
 
 
 Stalingrad at Reelviews.net (James Berardinelli)
 

1993 films
1990s war drama films
Films set in the 1940s
German war drama films
1990s German-language films
1990s Russian-language films
German epic films
Films directed by Joseph Vilsmaier
War epic films
World War II films based on actual events
Anti-war films about World War II
Films about the Battle of Stalingrad
Films set in Liguria
Siege films
Films shot in the Czech Republic
1993 drama films
German World War II films
1990s German films